John Jamison Pearce (February 28, 1826 – May 26, 1912) was a Republican member of the U.S. House of Representatives from Pennsylvania.

John J. Pearce was born in Wilkes-Barre, Pennsylvania.  He completed preparatory studies and was ordained a minister in the Methodist Episcopal Church when eighteen years of age.  He joined the Baltimore Conference and served as pastor at Warriors Mark, Jersey Shore, and Lock Haven, Pennsylvania.

Pearce was elected as an Opposition Party candidate to the Thirty-fourth Congress.  He declined to be a candidate for reelection in 1856.  He served as a pastor in various localities until he retired to Lock Haven in 1888.  He moved to Conneaut, Ohio, where he died in 1912.  Interment in Highland Cemetery in Lock Haven, Pennsylvania.

Sources

The Political Graveyard

1826 births
1912 deaths
Politicians from Wilkes-Barre, Pennsylvania
American Methodist clergy
Opposition Party members of the United States House of Representatives from Pennsylvania
People from Conneaut, Ohio
19th-century American politicians
19th-century Methodists